Klara Ivanovna Guseva (8 March 1937 in Tambov Oblast – 12 May 2019) was a Russian speed skater. After her marriage, she was also known as Klara Nesterova.

Born in the Russian SFSR, Klara Guseva competed for the Soviet Union. She trained at Spartak in Ryazan. She won a silver medal at the Soviet Allround Championships in 1960 and participated one month later in the 1960 Winter Olympics in Squaw Valley. These were the first Winter Olympics where speed skating for women was on the programme. Guseva participated in the 500 m and finished 6th. The next day, she finished 4th on the 1,500 m. The day after that, she started in the first pair on the 1,000 m and skated a new Olympic record time of 1:34.1. Nobody was able to beat that time and Guseva was Olympic Champion on the 1,000 m, ahead of silver medallist Helga Haase, who had become the first female Olympic Champion in speed skating when she won the 500 m two days earlier.

After that, Guseva participated in the World Allround Championships once, the 1964 Winter Olympics in Innsbruck, and a few more Soviet Allround Championships, but she did not win any more medals.

Guseva died in a car accident on 12 May 2019 in Moscow.

Notes

References

External links
Klara Guseva at SkateResults.com
Soviet Championships results   

1937 births
2019 deaths
Russian female speed skaters
Soviet female speed skaters
Speed skaters at the 1960 Winter Olympics
Speed skaters at the 1964 Winter Olympics
Olympic speed skaters of the Soviet Union
Olympic medalists in speed skating
Medalists at the 1960 Winter Olympics
Olympic gold medalists for the Soviet Union
Spartak athletes